Anshul Verma (born 18 July 1974) is an Indian politician, currently with from the Samajwadi Party  He had represented the Hardoi Lok Sabha constituency, from 2014 to 2019, for BJP but later quit from the party.

Early life and education

Anshul Verma was born on July 18, 1974 to Shri Shyam Lal and Smt. Shanta Verma. He was born in Pushptali, Hardoi, Uttar Pradesh. His educational qualifications include M.A. (History), LL.B. and he received his education at Punjab University, Chandigarh. Anshul Verma married Sharuti Verma on March 23, 2008.

Political career

May, 2014: Elected to 16th Lok Sabha
1 Sep. 2014 onwards: Member, Standing Committee on Personnel, Public Grievances, Law and Justice; Member, Consultative Committee, Ministry of Trade & Commerce
27 March 2019: left Bhartiya Janta Party and join Samajwadi Party

References

Living people
India MPs 2014–2019
Lok Sabha members from Uttar Pradesh
People from Hardoi district
1974 births